Hauraki was a New Zealand parliamentary Māori electorate returning one Member of Parliament to the New Zealand House of Representatives. The electorate's area was formed from the northern portion of Te Tai Rawhiti as well as a small portion of Te Tai Hauāuru. Its area was expanded significantly westward to form the Tainui electorate for the 2002 election.

History
Hauraki was the first Māori seat based exclusively around Auckland, and it was created at the time of the first review of Mixed Member Proportional (MMP) boundaries, ahead of the 1999 election. Hauraki was named after both the gulf at Auckland's eastern side, and Hauraki, a pan-tribal union based around an area including the Coromandel Peninsula, Thames Valley, and the Western Bay of Plenty. Hauraki's boundary stretched out of Auckland, down through the eastern Waikato to include Morrinsville and the Coromandel.

The area around Auckland now belongs to the Tāmaki Makaurau electorate, and the southern area went to the  electorate.

Members of Parliament for Hauraki
Key

List MPs
Members of Parliament elected from party lists in elections where that person also unsuccessfully contested the Hauraki electorate.

Election results

1999 election

References

Historical Māori electorates
Politics of the Auckland Region
1999 establishments in New Zealand
2002 disestablishments in New Zealand